Shock troop might refer to:

 Shock troops, troops intended to lead an attack
 Shock Troopers, an arcade game
 Shock Troops (album), an album by punk rock band Cock Sparrer, released in 1982
 Shock Troop (film), a 1934 German film
 Shock Troops (film), a 1967 French film
 Shock (troupe), an English music/mime/dance/pop group